The Gordon Craig Theatre is the only major theatre in Stevenage, Hertfordshire. Opened in 1975, the 501-seat theatre on Lytton Way houses its own rehearsal room, scenic workshop, wardrobe, cafe, bar, art gallery and restaurant.

Overview 
The theatre is housed in the Stevenage Arts & Leisure Centre, which is situated on Lytton Way, directly opposite Stevenage Railway Station and is connected to the station by a bridge extending across the dual carriageway. The Arts & Leisure Centre is accessible by train (via the bridge), car (via Lytton Way), bus (via Stevenage Bus Interchange) and foot (via the Town Centre).
Taking its name from Edward Gordon Craig, the internationally renowned theatre practitioner who was born less than a mile away, the theatre has become a key part of the cultural offering of the area. Designed to accommodate orchestral concerts alongside produced and visiting theatrical events, it has also been used to screen films and host organ recitals. The Theatres Trust describes the theatre as: "probably the best-designed civic entertainment centre of its type in the country".

The theatre was officially opened in February 1976 by HRH Prince Philip, Duke of Edinburgh.

The Stevenage Arts & Leisure Centre contains two halls. The smaller of these is the Gordon Craig Theatre itself, which has a capacity of 501. The stage features a proscenium up to 12.2m wide and the stage depth is 7.62m. The theatre boasts a proud tradition of presenting plays, pantomime, opera, dance and orchestral concerts.

Also located within the Arts & Leisure Centre is the Concert Hall, derived from a large gymnasium, which has a capacity of 1,200. The concert hall plays host to a variety of shows including live music and comedy.

History 
From the early 1960s there was discussion on the need for an Arts / Leisure centre in the new town of Stevenage. In 1968 Stevenage Arts Trust resolved to commence the building of an Arts Centre on land granted by Stevenage Development Corporation. Architects Messrs Vincent, Gorbing and Partners drew up detailed plans for a 488-seat theatre to cost £300,000. The scheme was put on hold due to a lack of capital. In 1968 a feasibility study was commissioned by Stevenage Urban District Council and the Stevenage Development Corporation for a combined Arts/Sports Centre. In 1969 Stevenage Urban District Council and Stevenage Development Corporation accepted the Initial Design Brief prepared by the architects. In 1972, the architects confirmed that the final design drawings were completed, the final cost was estimated at £1,610,218. The foundation stone was laid on 14 June 1974 by Baroness Lee, the former Labour minister, Jennie Lee. Opening for The Danesgate Theatre, as the building was then to be known, was planned for November 1975.

Naming and Openings 
On the suggestion of Roger Dyason, the first Arts' Manager of the Centre, proposal was made in August 1975 to a Full Council Meeting of Stevenage Borough Council that the theatre should be named The Gordon Craig Theatre. This motion was passed. The £2.7 million sports and arts centre opened to the public on 3 November 1975 with a gala variety bill produced by Bunny Baron featuring Ted Rogers. The Leisure Centre was officially opened in February 1976 by HRH Prince Philip, The Duke of Edinburgh, accompanied by the Director of Leisure Services at Stevenage Borough Council, Mr M. L. Banks.

Design 
The theatre has a plain, fan-shaped auditorium with excellent sightlines. It is a modern, fully-equipped touring and, occasionally, producing theatre with fourteen dressing rooms, an optional orchestra pit, and has an intimate atmosphere; it has also been used for cinema screenings.

Architect Ray Gorbing's original exterior design proved controversial. It attracted both admirers and those horrified at the aesthetic of the building. Panels of glass and reinforced plastic had been used to insulate the building against noise from rail, road and overhead aircraft. The orange coloured cladding led to it being nicknamed "Gorbing’s orange box". The Architects' Journal described the building: "designed as a simple rectangular coloured box… it reflects the integration of activities within and also expresses the introvert nature of these activities…the bright colour provides a positive image." The orange cladding was later replaced.

Performances 
The programme offered by the Gordon Craig Theatre is currently strongly focused on music (including tribute bands), comedy, popular dance, popular entertainment and family shows. The theatre also plays host to productions presented by local amateur and community groups. In addition, since 2012 the theatre has produced three shows in-house annually, incorporating musicals and drama.

Pantomimes 
One of the major highlights of the yearly programme is the pantomime. Incorporating some of the top names in the entertainment world and budding local performers, the theatre's pantomime attracts record-breaking attendances year on year.

Gordon Craig Theatre Productions

Notable Performances by Decade

Visiting Amateur Groups 
The Gordon Craig Theatre was conceived by the local authority to provide amenities for Stevenage residents. It was built to a specification to allow use by large amateur operatic and dramatic societies with elaborate productions. Its design architect, Ray Gorbing, was an avid member of local group The Stevenage Lytton Players. Many local schools, colleges, dance, theatre, music, religious and Scouts groups have performed on the Gordon Craig Theatre's stage as well as these notable visiting groups:

 The Stevenage Lytton Players
 Letchworth Arcadians
 Hitchin Thespians
 Luton Amateur Operatic & Dramatic Society
 Broadhall Players
 Stevenage Symphony Orchestra
 North Herts Music School
 Stevenage Ladies Choir
 Stevenage Male Voice Choir

The English Sinfonia 
The English Sinfonia was an orchestra who made the Gordon Craig Theatre their home in 1997. To celebrate the residency, they commissioned Michael Nyman to write Strong on Oaks, Strong on the Causes of Oaks, a five-movement orchestral work taking its name from the Anglo-Saxon name of the town, "Sithenaece" meaning "Strong on Oaks". The English Sinfonia's conductors, leaders and soloists at the Gordon Craig Theatre included Bramwell Tovey, Janice Graham, Nicolae Moldoveanu, John Lill, John Farrer, Julian Llloyd Webber and Evelyn Glennie. The residency at the Gordon Craig Theatre ended in 2006.

Saturday Mornings 1975–1993 
Saturday Morning shows for children were an integral part of the Gordon Craig programme in the theatre's early years. Jack Mayes lived and performed in the town and was a popular Stevenage personality, performing alongside his puppet Hairy Harry as "the almost famous Jack Mayes". His shows ran from 1975 until 1993, when he finally called it a day at The Gordon Craig Theatre.

Organ 
The theatre is also notable for the popular and still playable 1932 Christie theatre organ, which was installed in 1987 after originally being in the Carlton cinema, Tuebrook, Liverpool. The re-homed Christie had its Grand Opening Concert at the Gordon Craig Theatre at 3:00pm on Sunday 27 September 1987. Five famous organists performed that afternoon; Frank Fowler (Managing Director of Hill Norman & Beard), George Blackmore, Joanna Fraser, Janet Dowsett and finally William Davies. The console for the organ can be played in the orchestra pit or brought onto the stage.

The Christie Organ will be returning to the stage for the first time after a very long break, on 15th September 2022

References 

Stevenage
Theatres in Hertfordshire
1976 establishments in England